Oil reserves in Iraq are considered the world's fifth-largest proven oil reserves, with 140 billion barrels. 

As a result of military occupation and civil unrest, the official statistics have not been revised since 2001 and are largely based on 2-D seismic data from three decades ago. International geologists and consultants have estimated that unexplored territory may contain vastly larger reserves. The majority of Iraq's proven reserves of oil comes from the following cities: Basra (Being #1), Baghdad (Being #2), Ramadi (Being #3), and finally, Ba'aj (Being the last oil rich city).

A measure of the uncertainty about Iraq's oil reserves is indicated by widely differing estimates. The U.S. Department of Energy (DOE) estimated in 2003 that Iraq had . Iraq's prewar deputy oil minister said that potential reserves might be . The source of the uncertainty is that due to decades of war and unrest, many of Iraq's oil wells are run down and unkept. Repairs to the wells and oil facilities should make far more oil available economically from the same deposits. Iraq may prove to contain the largest extractable deposits of oil in the entire Middle East once these upgrading and facility improvements have advanced.

After more than a decade of sanctions and two Gulf Wars, Iraq's oil infrastructure needs modernization and investment. Despite a large reconstruction effort, the Iraqi oil industry has not been able to meet hydrocarbon production and export targets. The World Bank estimates that an additional $1 billion per year would need to be invested just to maintain current production. Long-term Iraq reconstruction costs could reach $100 billion or higher, of which more than a third will go to the oil, gas and electricity sectors. Another challenge to Iraq's development of the oil sector is that resources are not evenly divided across sectarian lines. Most known resources are in the Shiite areas of the south and the Kurdish areas of the north, with few resources in control of the Sunni population in the center.

Iraq's reserve to production ratio is 158 years. After the end of the invasion the production increased on a high level, even though there is an invasion from the self-proclaimed Islamic State of Iraq and the Levant the production in March 2016 stood at 4.55 million barrels a day. Which seems to well become a new all-time peak year for Iraq if OPEC talks about freezing or reduce production held in April 2016 will not lead to a reduction. The old peak was 1979 with 171.6 million tons of oil compared to 136.9 million tons produced in 2011 and 152.4 million tons in 2012.

Oil extraction contracts awarded

2009
On June 30 and December 11, 2009, the Iraqi Ministry of Oil awarded contracts to international oil companies for some of Iraq's many oil fields. The winning oil companies entered joint ventures with the Iraqi Ministry of Oil, and the terms of the awarded contracts include extraction of oil for a fixed gain of $1.40 per barrel for the oil companies with the remainder going to Iraq. The fees will only be paid once a production threshold set by the Iraqi ministry of oil is reached.

Oil fields contracted include the "super-giant" Majnoon Field, Halfaya Field, West Qurna Field and Rumaila Field. The East Baghdad Field, situated in part under Sadr City, did not receive any bids and the Iraqi oil ministry is considering working the field itself. Oil minister Hussein al-Shahristani told Iraqi public television that the increasing oil production "would finance infrastructure projects across Iraq - schools, roads, airports, housing, hospitals".

See also

Iraq War
Petroleum industry in Iraq

References

External links
 Information on oil contracts and terms, from SIGIR